Strangerland is a 2015 drama suspense film directed by Kim Farrant in her directorial debut, and written by Michael Kinirons and Fiona Seres. The film stars Nicole Kidman, Joseph Fiennes, and Hugo Weaving. The film premiered at the Sundance Film Festival on 23 January 2015. The film did not have a theatrical release in its native Australia, but did receive a limited release in cinemas in the United States on 10 July 2015 by Alchemy.

Plot
Catherine and Matthew Parker move with their children Lily and Tom to the remote Australian desert town of Nathgari. Although the family is unhappy with the move, Matthew and Tom blame Lily for forcing them to leave the larger town of Coonaburra. When he can't sleep, Tom sometimes walks around the neighbourhood at night, an activity his parents discourage. One night, Matthew sees Tom leave the house, followed by Lily.   Half asleep, he says nothing and goes back to sleep. Next morning Catherine oversleeps, and when she cannot find the kids, calls Matthew at work. He reassures her that they must have gone to school before she woke up. When the school calls to report that Tom and Lily have not been attending, she once again becomes worried, as a dust storm is forecast to hit the town.  Matthew discourages her from contacting anyone, as he does not wish the family's business to once again become public knowledge. Against his wishes, Catherine contacts several people and finally the police.

While taking their report, Detective David Rae finds that Lily has once before been reported missing. Catherine and Matthew reluctantly reveal that she merely disappeared for a few days, they panicked and reported, but she soon turned up at a friend's house. After further investigation, Rae learns that one of Lily's Coonaburra teachers, Neil McPherson, had sex with her. When Matthew found out, he beat up McPherson, earning a restraining order. The Parkers admit to Rae that they were forced to leave Coonaburra to escape the attention. Catherine becomes frustrated with Matthew's focus on his job as a pharmacist, though he insists that he has no choice, since the community needs his services. Rae's queries in town reveal that Lily had indeed multiple sexual relationships despite being underage (she's fifteen). When Catherine finds Lily's diary she reluctantly reads it. It's irate/angsty with hyper-sexualised imagery and includes pictures and poetry about several people: McPherson, the Parker's mentally handicapped handyman Burtie, and a local youth nicknamed Slug. It also describes her parents' marriage as a sham, which causes Catherine to cry. Catherine hands the diary to Rae with the proviso that he not reveal it to Matthew.

Matthew drives to Coonaburra, where he questions and threatens McPherson. Coreen, Rae's girlfriend and Burtie's sister, becomes annoyed when Rae won't share details of the case with her. She's also jealous, fearing Rae is attracted to Catherine. Rae secretly shreds the evidence from the diary that connects Burtie to Lily and discourages Burtie from telling him anything incriminating. Rae arrests Slug, but without any evidence of an actual crime, must release him. When the kids remain missing, the town organises a search party. Matthew refuses to participate, further angering Catherine. Rae suggests to Catherine that her children could have run away for a reason closer to home. Catherine confronts Matthew with Lily's sexual history and asks if he ever molested her. Incredulous, he denies it and asks why she would even ask; she cites his apparent reluctance to help find the kids. Knowing now that Burtie had a sexual relationship with Lily, Matthew beats up Burtie and searches his house. Coreen demands Rae arrest Matthew, and when she accuses him of taking the Parkers' side, Rae reveals Burtie's connection.

Burtie visits the Parkers and asks to speak with Matthew. Catherine invites him in, but he leaves when she attempts to seduce him in Lily's clothes. When Matthew drives into the desert alone, in the opposite direction of the other searchers, he finds Tom dehydrated and delirious. Tom initially refuses to speak, so Catherine yells at him; Tom eventually tells Matthew that he saw Lily get into a car. Catherine listens as locals discuss Lily's disappearance and likely death, and becomes distraught when she receives prank calls that call Lily "a whore". Desperate, she visits Rae, and when she fails to seduce him, wanders into the desert night, alone. Unsure why she's hated or has done wrong, she despairs. Next morning, traumatised and stripped naked, she reappears in town; gathering all to gawp. Matthew rescues her, then tenderly bathes her. In bed together, as they hold each other, Catherine admits that she hid the diary from Matthew, and Matthew reveals he saw the kids leave that night.  He admits he did not stop them because, angry with Lily, he wanted to punish her. Catherine hugs Tom and walks onto the porch, where she and Matthew console each other. While holding Lily's diary, Matthew cries and says that he wishes he could take back that one moment.

Two passages of Lily's poetry, in her voice, over aerial imagery of the vast outstretching 'Outback' - Lily's fate is left uncertain...

Cast
 Nicole Kidman as Catherine Parker
 Joseph Fiennes as Matthew Parker
 Hugo Weaving as David Rae
 Maddison Brown as Lily Parker
 Lisa Flanagan as Coreen
 Meyne Wyatt as Burtie
 Nicholas Hamilton as Tom Parker
 Martin Dingle-Wall as Neil McPherson

Production
On 20 October 2013, Nicole Kidman, Guy Pearce, and Hugo Weaving joined the cast of the thriller film. Screen Australia announced it would finance the film. Macdara Kelleher and Naomi Wench were announced as producers, and Kim Farrant was announced as director, with a script by Fiona Seres and Michael Kinirons. The other cast members announced included Lisa Flanagan, Martin Dingle-Wall, Meyne Wyatt and Nicholas Hamilton. On 13 March 2014, Joseph Fiennes joined the film, replacing Pearce. On 27 March 2014, it was announced that Maddison Brown had landed a lead role in the film to debut her acting career, which Worldview Entertainment would finance.

Filming
On 27 March 2014, it was announced that the shooting of the film was set to start in the last week of March in Sydney. The filming was also set to take place in Canowindra and Broken Hill in New South Wales, and Alice Springs in the Northern Territory. Shooting began on 31 March 2014.

Release
The film had its world premiere at the Sundance Film Festival on 23 January 2015. Shortly after the premiere, Alchemy acquired the US distribution rights to the film. The film went on to screen at the Belgrade Film Festival, Seattle International Film Festival, Sydney Film Festival. The film was released in the United States on 10 July 2015 in a limited release and through video on demand.

The film did not release to cinemas in Australia, but was released to DVD, Blu-Ray & Digital by Transmission.

Reception

Marketing
An image and a new synopsis was revealed on 5 May 2014. On 3 June 2015, the official poster was released.

Critical response
Strangerland was met with mixed to negative reviews, earning a 41% approval rating on Rotten Tomatoes based on 68 critics with a weighted average score of 5.17/10. The site's consensus: "Strangerland has a marvelous cast, but their efforts aren't enough to overcome the story's blandly predictable melodrama.". Metacritic reports a normalized score of 42 out of 100, based on 13 critics, indicating "mixed or average reviews".

Brad Wheeler of The Globe and Mail gave a positive review, calling it "Eerie and unpredictable, Strangerland holds attention, even if traditional suspense tricks are avoided like they were dingos at the daycare." Matthew Lickona of San Diego Reader commented "Director Kim Farrant goes for a feeling that's as harsh, unforgiving, and wild as the land she lets the camera linger on, and it's the right idea when handling the potential melodrama of the material." Staci Layne Wilson of AtHomeInHollywood.com stated that the film is "presented through a prism of womanly wantonness juxtaposed with a mother's pain and fear." Joe McGovern of Entertainment Weekly complimented Nicole Kidman, saying "her best performances have often been as grieving moms (Dead Calm, The Others, Rabbit Hole) and here she provides the flaccid movie's sole flash of daring and unpredictability."

Richard Roeper of the Chicago Sun-Times gave a negative review, saying the film "runs out of gas, leaving us with a couple of final "Forget You" (shall we say) moments. Thanks. Thanks for nothing."

Accolades

References

External links
 
  (rating 2/5)

Films shot in Sydney
Worldview Entertainment films
Australian thriller drama films
Irish thriller drama films
2015 thriller drama films
Films about missing people
Films about children
Films set in Australia
2015 directorial debut films
2015 films
2015 drama films
2010s English-language films